Events from the year 1998 in Indonesia.

In Indonesia, this year was noted for the May 1998 riots due to dissatisfaction with Suharto's 31-year New Order regime, culminating in Suharto's resignation on 21 May 1998.

Incumbents 

 President: Suharto (until 21 May), B. J. Habibie (after 21 May)
 Vice-President: Try Sutrisno (until 11 March), B. J. Habibie (11 March to 21 May), Vacant (after 21 May)

Events

February 

 11 February: J. Soedradjad Djiwandono is dismissed from his office of the governor of the Bank of Indonesia.

May 

 4 May: The start of the May riots in Indonesia.
 12 May: Trisakti shootings – Indonesian National Army soldiers fire and kill four protestors. This causes the start of the riots in Jakarta.
 15 May:  – A fire in the Klender Mall due to looting leaves at least 200 people dead.
 21 May: Fall of Suharto – Suharto resigns as president.

August 

 22 August: The 1990–1998 Indonesian military operations in Aceh ends.

October 

 26 October: 1998 Indonesia Open starts.

November 

 1 November: 1998 Indonesia Open ends.
 18 November: Semanggi I shooting – 17 people are killed and many injured after troops fired on protestors near the Semanggi intercharge.

December 

 25 December - 29 December: First Poso riot.

Births 

 25 February – Rizky Febian, singer-songwriter, actor, TV presenter.
 31 August – Sugeng Efendi, professional footballer.

Deaths 

 8 January – Alamsyah Ratu Perwiranegara, military general (born 1925).
 9 October – Ita Martadinata Haryono, human rights activist (born 1980).

References

Sources 
 

1998 in Indonesia
Indonesia
Years of the 20th century in Indonesia
1990s in Indonesia
Indonesia